Astral Voyage (released in Japan as Ten Kai) is the first studio album by Japanese new-age musician, Kitarō. Released as Ten Kai in 1978, the album was re-released as Astral Voyage in 1985 by Geffen Records after Kitarō signed a worldwide distribution deal with them.

Track listing 
All music composed by Kitarō 喜多郎.

Side one

 "By the Seaside" – 6:00
 "Soul of the Sea" – 2:40
 "Micro Cosmos" – 4:50
 "Beat" – 4:50
 "Fire" – 7:12

Side two

 "Mu" – 2:38
 "Dawn of the Astral" – 5:10
 "Endless Dreamy World" – 3:28
 "Kaiso" – 4:34
 "Astral Voyage" – 8:00

Personnel 

 Kitarō – bass, drums, acoustic guitar, koto, mandolin, Moog synthesizer, synthesizer, percussion
 Ryusuke Seto – biwa, shakuhachi
 Lavi – sitar

Production

 Taka Nanri – Producer
 Jeffrey Kent Ayeroff – Cover design
 Moko Nanri – Executive producer

References

External links 
Kitaro Official Page (English)
Kitaro Official Page (Japanese)
Kitaro TV -Kitaro's Official YouTube Page

1978 debut albums
Kitarō albums